"aaap" or "AAAP" may refer to:
 Amateur Astronomers Association of Pittsburgh
 Amino Acid/Auxin Permease (AAAP) Family, family of secondary transport proteins
 American Academy of Addiction Psychiatry
 American Association of Applied Psychologists
 Asociación de Atletismo del Alto Paraná
 Association for the Advancement of AcuEnergetics® Practitioners (AAAP)
 American Association for Applied Psychology
 NASDAQ-Code for Advanced Accelerator Applications
 Atheists & Agnostics Alliance Pakistan